Phillip G. Steck (born July 8, 1959) is a Democratic member of the New York State Assembly representing Assembly District 110, which comprises the eastern tip of Schenectady and northeastern tip of Albany County.

Early life and career
Steck is the son of Ernest, a high school athletic director, and Roselyn, a middle school teacher. He played varsity football and graduated the valedictorian of his class from The Albany Academy in 1977. He earned a degree in Government from Harvard University in 1981 and a law degree from the University of Pennsylvania Law School in 1984. In college, he interned on the staff of Congressman Ben Rosenthal. For several years after college, he worked as an assistant district attorney in New York and Rensselaer Counties. He then entered private practice for the Capital District law firm of Cooper Erving & Savage where he has worked ever since.

Political career

Steck's political career began in 1999 when he was elected to the Albany County Legislature; he served three terms there.

In 2008, he ran for Congress in New York's 21st congressional district, but lost in the Democratic primary.

In 2012, Steck won a seat in the New York State Assembly.

He endorsed Bernie Sanders for the 2020 Primary.

References

External links
New York Assembly member website
Campaign website
Congressional campaign website
Employer attorney profile
Times Union blog

|-

1959 births
Harvard College alumni
Living people
County legislators in New York (state)
Democratic Party members of the New York State Assembly
Politicians from New York City
University of Pennsylvania Law School alumni
People from Loudonville, New York
21st-century American politicians
Working Families Party politicians
The Albany Academy alumni